Han Myung-Woo (Hangul: 한명우, Hanja: 韓明愚; born November 12, 1956 in Dangjin, Chungcheongnam-do) is a retired South Korean freestyle wrestler and Olympic champion. He won the gold medal at the 1988 Summer Olympics in Seoul. He also competed at the 1984 Summer Olympics.

Han is currently a wrestling commentator for KBS television and the executive director of the Korea Wrestling Federation.

References

External links

1956 births
Living people
South Korean wrestlers
Olympic wrestlers of South Korea
Wrestlers at the 1984 Summer Olympics
Wrestlers at the 1988 Summer Olympics
South Korean male sport wrestlers
Olympic gold medalists for South Korea
Olympic medalists in wrestling
Asian Games medalists in wrestling
Wrestlers at the 1986 Asian Games
Medalists at the 1988 Summer Olympics
Asian Games gold medalists for South Korea
Medalists at the 1986 Asian Games
People from Dangjin
20th-century South Korean people
21st-century South Korean people